The term loss of soul - In shamanism the term refers to the loss of human part of the life force, soul.

Causes of soul loss in shamanism 
The prevailing concept in traditional shamanism is "any illness is a consequence of a lost or stolen soul. The Khanty and Mansi had the idea that a person had five souls.

The main explanation of the mechanism of soul loss is that in order to preserve oneself in an intolerable situation, part of the soul leaves, as continuing to be in these conditions is so uncomfortable that it can lead to complete disintegration. 

In some cultures saying God bless you after sneezing is believed to help prevent soul loss

In Bali Motorcycle accidents are believed to cause soul loss, resulting in a revival of the belief

Symptoms of Soul Loss in Shamanism 
Sandra Ingerman, in her book Return of the Soul, identifies the following symptoms of soul loss:

 Dissociation
 Chronic illnesses
 Depression
 Multiple personality syndrome
 Chemical dependency
 Post-traumatic stress disorder
 Difficulty making decisions
 Feeling numb
 Apathy
 Chronic bad luck
 Memory lapses

Soul Retrieval by a Shaman 
Some people believe that the soul can be returned with the help of shaman, that he goes to his helper spirits and/or teachers with a request to help in the return of the soul, negotiates with the part of the soul found, asks about the reasons for its departure, finds out the conditions under which the soul will be willing to return, with the claim that the shaman shifts the vast majority of the work of returning the soul to other entities.
In preparation for the return of the soul, the shaman may preliminarily produce the return of an animal power.

References 

Shamanism
Pages with unreviewed translations